Lachlan Norris (born 21 January 1987) is an Australian former professional racing cyclist, who rode professionally between 2009 and 2018 for the , ,  (two spells) and  teams.

Prior to his career on the road, Norris represented Australia at 8 World Mountain Bike Championships from 2004-2011.

Major results

2005 
 1st Australian Mountain Bike Championships, Junior XC
2006
 3rd Australian Mountain Bike Championships, U23 XC
2007
 2nd Australian Mountain Bike Championships, U23 XC
2009
 1st Australian Mountain Bike Championships, U23 XC
2010
 2nd Overall Tour of Wellington
2011
 4th Overall Tour de Taiwan
 9th Overall Tour of Wellington
2012
 1st  Overall Tour of Tasmania
2013
 1st Mountains classification Circuit des Ardennes
2014
 3rd  Time trial, Oceania Road Championships
 4th Overall Tour de Korea
 6th Overall Tour de Kumano
 10th Overall Tour of Utah
2015
 6th Overall USA Pro Cycling Challenge
 6th Overall Tour of Utah
1st Stage 7
 8th Overall Herald Sun Tour
 9th Time trial, Oceania Road Championships
2016
 5th Road race, Oceania Road Championships
 8th Overall Tour de Langkawi
 9th Overall Flèche du Sud
2017
 5th Overall Tour of Japan
2018
 7th Chrono Kristin Armstrong

References

External links
 

1987 births
Living people
Australian male cyclists
People from Kalgoorlie